Parliamentary elections were held in the Federated States of Micronesia on 8 March 1983. All candidates for seats in Congress ran as independents.

Results

Aftermath
Following the elections, Tosiwo Nakayama was unanimously re-elected president. Bailey Olter was elected vice president, defeating incumbent Petrus Tun.

References

Micronesia
1983 in the Federated States of Micronesia
Elections in the Federated States of Micronesia
Non-partisan elections